Ilyplanidae is a family of flatworms belonging to the order Polycladida.

Genera
The following genera are recognised in the family Ilyplanidae:
Genus Anandroplana 
Genus Crassandros 
Genus Enterogonia 
Genus Euilyoida 
Genus Ilyella 
Genus Ilyplana 
Genus Postenterogonia 
Genus Pulchriplana 
Genus Tripylocelis 
Genus Zygantroides 
Genus Zygantroplana 
Genus Zygantrum

References

Platyhelminthes